Karsten Dietrich Voigt (born 11 April 1941 in Elmshorn, Germany) is a German politician (SPD).

Early life and education
From 1960–1969, Voigt studied history, German, and Scandinavian languages and literature at the universities in Hamburg, Copenhagen, and Frankfurt.

Political career
From 1969 until 1972, Voigt was chairman of the Jusos. 

From 1976 to 1998, Voigt was a member of the German parliament, representing Frankfurt am Main I - Main-Taunus. In 1976, he was elected to the Bundestag for the first time. In 1983, the SPD parliamentary group made him their foreign policy spokesman; he held this office until leaving the parliament in 1998.

From 1999 to 2010, Voigt served as the "Coordinator of German-North American Cooperation" at the Foreign Office of Germany, under successive foreign ministers Joschka Fischer and Frank-Walter Steinmeier. He is a board member of the Atlantik-Brücke, an association which promotes German-American understanding.

Other activities
 Checkpoint Charlie Foundation, Member of the Supervisory Board
 Einstein Forum, Member of the Board of Trustees
 Ernst Reuter Foundation, Member of the Board of Trustees 
 German Council on Foreign Relations (DGAP), Member of the Steering Committee
 European Leadership Network (ELN), Senior Network Member

See also
Germany–United States relations

References

External links
Official biography
Interview with Mr. Voigt about a United Germany from the Dean Peter Krogh Foreign Affairs Digital Archives

1941 births
Living people
Members of the Bundestag for Hesse
Members of the Bundestag 1994–1998
Members of the Bundestag 1990–1994
Members of the Bundestag 1987–1990
Members of the Bundestag 1983–1987
Members of the Bundestag 1980–1983
Members of the Bundestag 1976–1980
Commanders Crosses of the Order of Merit of the Federal Republic of Germany
Members of the Bundestag for the Social Democratic Party of Germany